"Don't Kill My Vibe" is the 2017 debut single by Sigrid.

Don't Kill My Vibe may also refer to:

 Don't Kill My Vibe (EP), Sigrid's 2017 debut EP
 "Don't Kill My Vibe", a 2019 cover version of the Sigrid song by Elle Fanning for the Teen Spirit Original Soundtrack

See also
 "Bitch, Don't Kill My Vibe", a 2013 song by Kendrick Lamar